Wall is a civil parish in the district of Lichfield, Staffordshire, England.  The parish contains 14 listed buildings that are recorded in the National Heritage List for England.  All the listed buildings are designated at Grade II, the lowest of the three grades, which is applied to "buildings of national importance and special interest".  The parish contains the village of Wall and the surrounding area.  Most of the listed buildings are houses and farmhouses, the others being a well house, a conduit head, a barn, a church, and hand pump.


Buildings

Notes and references

Notes

Citations

Sources

Lichfield District
Lists of listed buildings in Staffordshire